Dolce Vita & Co is an Austrian television series.

See also
List of Austrian television series

External links
 

Austrian television series
ORF (broadcaster)
2001 Austrian television series debuts
2002 Austrian television series endings
2000s Austrian television series
German-language television shows